Miami is a coastal suburb in the City of Gold Coast, Queensland, Australia.

Geography

The town of North Burleigh is located within the suburb.

Miami has the following mountains:

 North Nobby 
 South Nobby (Little Burleigh) 

Miami has the following beaches:

 Nobby Beach extending north to Mermaid Beach
 Miami Beach
 North Burleigh Beach extening south to Burleigh Heads

Its commercial activity is mainly confined to the Gold Coast Highway and there is some light industry around Christine Avenue.

The Gold Coast Highway runs north to south through Miami, with Christine Avenue and Pacific Avenue connecting to the west.

History

The history of Miami can be dated back to the early 1920s when prospective investors were looking over plans for a new real estate development called Miami Shore at North Burleigh. The name "Miami Shore" was chosen as a reference to Miami Shores, Florida. The investors built their wooden or fibro bungalows on estates  thissuch as, or rented their cottages to holiday makers. They could also stay in the Hotel Miami which opened in 1925 by E. H. Berry. After the Great Depression, the community developed with construction of tennis courts and the Pizzey Park Sporting Complex.

Miami State High School opened on 1 January 1963. Because there was a visible rock face remaining from an earlier quarry, the school principal William Callinan covered it up with a set of huge yellow letters saying "HI MIAMI HIGH". It now says just "MIAMI HIGH".

On Sunday December 22, 1963, Calvary Memorial Catholic Church was officially opened and dedicated by Archbishop James Duhig. It commemorates those who served in the Korean War.

Miami State School opened on 30 January 1979; it is now within the suburb boundaries of Mermaid Waters. 

In 1988, Australian musician John Farnham's music video for the top-10 song "Two Strong Hearts" was filmed outside the famous "Miami Ice" factory at 2015 Gold Coast Highway.

Heritage listings

Miami has a number of heritage sites, including:

 2171 Gold Coast Highway: Miami State High School Sign

Education 

Miami State High School is a government secondary (7-12) school for boys and girls at 2137-2205 Gold Coast Highway. In 2018, the school had an enrolment of 1,255 students with 103 teachers (100 full-time equivalent) and 62 non-teaching staff (45 full-time equivalent). It includes a special education program.

Facilities 
Miami Day Hospital is a private day hospital at 24 Hillcrest Parade.

Amenities 

Pizzey Park is a major Gold Coast sporting and recreational located at 80 Pacific Avenue.

Calvary Catholic Church is at 50 Redondo Avenue. It is part of the Burleigh Heads Catholic Parish within the Archdiocese of Brisbane.

Burleigh Bears Rugby League Football Club is at 80 Pacific Avenue.

Gold Coast Burleigh Golf Club is an 18-hole golf course at 114 Albion Street.

There are two surf life saving clubs in Miami:

 Miami Beach Surf Life Saving Club, 2 Hythe Street
 North Burleigh Surf Life Saving Club, 293 The Esplanade

Other sporting teams include the Eastern Cobras.

Transport 
Miami has two high frequency bus services that run at intervals of 8–15 minutes during peak times. Buses that travel through the suburb are: 700 Broadbeach South - Tweed Heads (the 700 gets extend to the Gold Coast University Hospital between 12am-5am weekdays), 777 Broadbeach South - Gold Coast Airport (777 is an express bus route) and the TX1 Tweed Heads - Dream World (TX1 is a theme park express service only). All bus services on the Gold Coast are provided by Surfside Buslines under contract by Translink, a subsidiary of the Department of Transport and Main Roads.

References

Sources

External links

 
 
Map of Miami

Suburbs of the Gold Coast, Queensland
Coastline of Queensland
Australian places named after U.S. places or U.S. history